William Downie Stewart may refer to:
William Downie Stewart Sr (1842–1898), member of House of Representatives for City of Dunedin and Dunedin West
William Downie Stewart Jr (1878–1949), historian; mayor of Dunedin; son of William Downie Stewart Sr

See also
William Stewart (disambiguation)